The Electronic Entertainment Expo 2011 (E3 2011) was the 17th E3 held. The event took place at the Los Angeles Convention Center in Los Angeles, California. It began on June 7, 2011, and ended on June 9, 2011, with 46,800 total attendees. E3 2011 was broadcast on the G4 channel.

The main highlights of the 2011 show included a demonstration of Sony's next-generation handheld game console, the PlayStation Vita; the official introduction of Nintendo's Wii U home console; and the unveiling of Microsoft's long-awaited game, Halo 4.

Press conferences

As in previous years, the conference was dominated by announcements from the three main console manufacturers: Microsoft, Sony and Nintendo. Tech analysts considered the unveiling of Nintendo's Wii U and its then-unnamed tablet controller to be E3's biggest event, with Sony's PlayStation Vita handheld console also generating considerable press attention. The Wii U system was credited by several media outlets as a "next-generation" console. Microsoft did not announce any major hardware releases, but did showcase a number of games for its Kinect controller-free gaming system.

Konami
Konami held its own pre-E3 event on June 2 to showcase its upcoming games. The showcase featured live events in a number of cities, including Los Angeles, San Francisco, Toronto, São Paulo, and Mexico City.

Microsoft
Microsoft's press conference took place on June 6 at 9:00am. It focused on the Xbox 360; it was titled the "Xbox 360 E311 Media Briefing" event. Call of Duty: Modern Warfare 3 was shown during Microsoft's press conference.

Electronic Arts
Electronic Arts took the stage on June 6 at 12:30pm.

Ubisoft
Ubisoft held a press conference on June 6 at 2:30pm.

Sony
Sony's press conference took place on June 6 at 5:00pm. However, the conference was delayed for 16 minutes. The press conference focused on the company's upcoming device, PlayStation Vita, and the PlayStation 3.

Nintendo
Nintendo's press conference took place on June 7 at 9:00am at the Nokia Theatre. Nintendo unveiled the successor to its Wii console, the Wii U, which was released in 2012. A prototype of the console was playable to attendees of the event.

List of featured games
This is a list of notable titles that appeared at E3 2011.

List of notable exhibitors
This is a list of major video game exhibitors who made appearances at E3 2011.

2K Games
Activision
Atari
Atlus
Bethesda
Capcom
Codemasters
Crytek

Disney
EA
Epic Games
Focus Home Interactive
Konami
LucasArts
Majesco Entertainment
Microsoft
Namco Bandai
Natsume
Nintendo
Nival
Paradox
Sega
Sony
Square Enix
Tecmo Koei
THQ
Ubisoft
Warner Bros.
Wargaming

References

2011 in Los Angeles
2011 in video gaming
2011
June 2011 events in the United States